Robert C. Beyer (born December 10, 1961) is an American professional basketball coach who serves as an assistant coach for the Charlotte Hornets of the National Basketball Association (NBA).

Early life and education
Beyer was born in LeRoy, New York and graduated from Alfred University in 1984 with a bachelor's degree in history with minors in coaching, writing, and secondary education. At Alfred, Beyer played three seasons on the basketball team before suffering a career-ending injury. Beyer served as assistant coach to the team as a senior in the 1983–84 season. Beyer then earned his master's degree in curriculum planning and development from the University of Albany in 1989.

Career
As a graduate student at Albany, Beyer was an assistant coach for the Albany Great Danes men's basketball team from 1985 to 1989. Beyer then was an assistant coach at Siena College from 1989 to 1993 and the University of Wisconsin from 1993 to 1994. Beyer returned to Siena to be head coach from 1994 to 1997. He returned to the assistant coaching ranks with Northwestern University from 1997 to 2000. Under Bob Knight, Beyer was an assistant coach at Texas Tech from 2001 to 2003. For the  season, Beyer was an assistant coach with the Toronto Raptors of the NBA; he was an advance scout the next season.

On July 3, 2007, Beyer was one of four assistants hired to serve under head coach of the NBA's Orlando Magic, Stan Van Gundy, for the 2007–08 season.

The Golden State Warriors of the NBA hired Beyer on September 11, 2012.

On July 1, 2013, Beyer was hired by the Charlotte Bobcats as an assistant coach for the 2013–14 season.

On May 30, 2014, Beyer was one of three assistants hired to serve under new Detroit Pistons head coach Stan Van Gundy.

On November 16, 2020, Beyer was hired as assistant coach by the New Orleans Pelicans.

Head coaching record

References

External links 

 NBA.com profile

1961 births
Living people
Albany Great Danes men's basketball coaches
Alfred Saxons men's basketball players
American men's basketball players
Basketball coaches from New York (state)
American expatriate basketball people in Canada
Basketball players from New York (state)
Charlotte Bobcats assistant coaches
College men's basketball head coaches in the United States
Dayton Flyers men's basketball coaches
Detroit Pistons assistant coaches
Golden State Warriors assistant coaches
New Orleans Pelicans assistant coaches
Northwestern Wildcats men's basketball coaches
Orlando Magic assistant coaches
Oklahoma City Thunder assistant coaches
People from Le Roy, New York
Sacramento Kings assistant coaches
Siena Saints men's basketball coaches
Texas Tech Red Raiders basketball coaches
Toronto Raptors assistant coaches
University at Albany, SUNY alumni
Wisconsin Badgers men's basketball coaches